Originally released as a part of the merchandise for 2003 Hulk film, Hulk Hands are a toy consisting of large foam-rubber clenched fists into which the wearer inserts their hands. They were first brainstormed by Sara Tresidder in 1997 when Marvel contracted external design consultation. When worn, they resemble green oversized boxing gloves that can be used to strike people or objects.  The Hulk Hands are wired so that when they are bashed together or against objects, they emit various smashing or crashing sound effects, as well as occasional Hulk-related roars or catch phrases.

The original release featured semi-open packaging and large "Try Me" tags, which made them extremely popular with children, but much less so with retailers who had to deal with damaged packaging. The Hulk Hands were easily the highest-selling and most popular of toys that Toy Biz produced from the movie license. Realizing their broader appeal, Toy Biz produced a number of runs both for the movie and under a generic comic-based Incredible Hulk banner, now favoring more enclosed packaging but retaining the "Try Me" angle. The version of Hulk Hands made for The Avengers film toyline, "Gamma Green Smash Fists" are smaller and a darker green than previous incarnations and made by Hasbro as part of  The Incredible Hulk (2008). For the Avengers: Age of Ultron toyline, "Hulk Gamma Grip Fists" differed by having open palms, allowing the wearer to loosely grip objects.

Similar products
Toy Biz also produced Electronic Thing Hands as merchandise for the 2005 Fantastic Four film.  The Thing Hands were basically a version of the Hulk Hands colored and textured to resemble those of the Thing, with appropriate sound effects and catch phrases.

Thing Hands made a watchdog group's list for 10 Most Dangerous Toys during the 2005 Christmas season, due to the risk of blunt trauma injuries.

Part of the toyline for Disney's 2012 film Wreck-It Ralph included cloth covered "Wrecking Fists" and foam "Smash Hands", both of which produce electronic sound effects.

Bruce Lee Dragon Fists are electronic plush toys that make sounds upon impact.

In addition to the open palmed "Gamma Grip Fists" for the 2015 Age of Ultron toyline, there were "Iron Man Arc FX Armor" hands and "Hulk Buster Gauntlets" as a Walmart exclusive.

See also
 Hulk

References

External links
Review and pictures from X-Entertainment
Official Hulk webpage at marvel.com

Hands
Hands
2000s toys
Products introduced in 2003
Marvel Comics action figure lines